The Van Buren County Community School District (VBCSD) is a rural public school district headquartered in Keosauqua, Iowa.

It is mostly in Van Buren County, and extends into Davis, Henry, and Lee counties. In addition to Keosauqua, it also serves Birmingham, Bonaparte, Cantril, Farmington, Hillsboro, Milton, and Stockport. It also serves two census-designated places in unincorporated Van Buren County: Douds and Leando.

History
It was established on July 1, 2019, by the merger of the Harmony Community School District and the Van Buren Community School District. The predecessor districts had begun a grade-sharing arrangement in which Harmony-zoned students attended Van Buren schools for grades 7–12 in 2016. The state of Iowa had changed its scheme for funding public schools, and the numbers of students in area schools had decreased.

In January 2018, the administrations of the Van Buren and Harmony districts began to consider merging. In February 2018 83% of the voters in the Van Buren and Harmony districts voted to merge, with 94% (of 637 voters) in favor in the pre-merger Van Buren district and 72% (of 619 voters) in favor in the pre-merger Harmony district.

The requirement for a merge was for both districts to each have over 50% of voters in favor.

There was a single superintendent and school board for both areas beginning on July 1, 2019.

Schools
The schools are:
 Van Buren County Community Middle/High School - Keosauqua
 Douds Elementary Attendance Center - unincorporated Van Buren County, adjacent to the Leando CDP
 Harmony Elementary Attendance Center - Unincorporated Van Buren County, near Farmington

Van Buren County Community High School

Athletics
The Warriors compete in the Southeast Iowa Superconference in the following sports:
Cross Country
Volleyball
Football
Wrestling
Basketball
Track and Field
Golf
Baseball
Softball

See also
List of school districts in Iowa
List of high schools in Iowa

References

External links
 Van Buren County Community School District

School districts in Iowa
2019 establishments in Iowa
School districts established in 2019
Education in Davis County, Iowa
Education in Henry County, Iowa
Education in Lee County, Iowa
Education in Van Buren County, Iowa